The Frog Rapids are located on the Pipestone River in the Kenora District of Northwestern Ontario, Canada. They occur just upstream of where the Pipestone River flows into Horseshoe Lake.

The segment of the Pipestone River where the Frog Rapids are located is not part of Pipestone River Provincial Park.

References
Atlas of Canada topographic map sheet 53B2 accessed 2007-11-10
The Official Road Map of Ontario on-line section 16 accessed 2007-11-10

Landforms of Kenora District
Rapids of Canada